, commonly called , is a fictional character in the Soulcalibur series of video games. Created by Namco's Project Soul division, she first appeared in the original Soulcalibur and its subsequent sequels, later appearing in various merchandise related to the series. She was voiced in Japanese by Yumi Tōma between Soulcalibur and Soulcalibur III, Kanako Tōjō between Soulcalibur Legends and Soulcalibur: Broken Destiny, and Miyuki Sawashiro in Soulcalibur V, and Soulcalibur VI; in English, she was voiced by Renee Hewitt in Soulcalibur II and Lani Minella for the remainder of the series.

In the game, she is the illegitimate daughter of undead pirate Cervantes de Leon who was raised by a noble family until her father became obsessed with the cursed sword, Soul Edge, leading to his death and later her mother's. Desiring to destroy the sword, she creates a segmented, animated blade-whip, only to become Soul Edge's pawn and learn that it intends to use her as its next host. After an attack by Cervantes results in the loss of her soul, Ivy uses a temporary artificial one to keep herself alive, and continues after the blade.

Ivy is considered one of the most prominent characters in the series as well as one of its mainstays, having appeared in every installment since Soulcalibur. She is often referred to as the series' poster girl. Since her introduction, Ivy has been regarded as an attractive and strong character by critics, and has been noted for her sex appeal. Critical reception varies, with some saying the character's oversexualization is unnecessary, while others have argued that her sexuality is an essential aspect of her character design and has allowed for her to be more recognizable.

Conception and creation
As a character introduced in Soulcalibur, Ivy's signature weapon, a "snake sword" designed to be unique amongst the other weapons in the game, was selected before other elements of the character. Her design and concept were then built to revolve around it, starting with gender, then physical measurements, and lastly background details. After her appearance and movement were fleshed out by a concept artist, her character was rendered as a 3D model by a design team that worked solely on her, and then animated mostly by Naotake Hirata using motion capture to create her in-game movements, with Yasushi Shibue designing the animations for her throws, and several animations created without the use of motion capture for positions difficult for the actors. During this phase the team additionally worked with the Soulcalibur story creators, refining the character's own role in the plot as needed throughout development.

During development many alternatives for Ivy's design were considered, including a male ninja, a mummy, and a little girl, while the weapon remained constant, varying only in size. With Soulcalibur II, the development team chose her as their favorite character from the previous title. Producer Hiroaki Yotoriyama felt that her fighting style was not perfectly expressed in Soulcalibur, and focused on Ivy from the start of the project to make her more "uniquely lethal". Namco has called Ivy one of the three most popular characters in the series in North American markets, alongside Taki and Nightmare. Soulcalibur V producer Hisaharu Tago emphasized this as a reason for the character's inclusion for the game, additionally citing her fighting style and role in the game's storyline.

Design

Ivy appears as a tall, large busted woman with short, white hair. A bluish-purple leotard covers her torso and arms, with patches of the fabric removed to expose her cleavage, buttocks and various parts of her abdomen. Similar leggings cover her legs midway below her thighs, connected to the leotard by garters at golden metal bands at their peak. A sleeve of the same material covers her right arm and hand, while armor covers her left arm, hand, and shoulder. A smaller pauldron covers her right shoulder, while high heels cover her feet, and a white glove covers her right hand. The left shoulder pauldron incorporates the Tudor Rose, a traditional heraldic symbol of England, while the plates of the armor were designed to resemble the links of her sword. A mask covering the right side of her face and eye were considered but abandoned after the initial character concept. The outfit was designed with a motif of both thorns and two intertwining snakes in mind, and to have a high affinity with her weapon. While it has been altered slightly as the series has progressed, the concept has remained consistent throughout the series, with the exception of the removal of the glove in later designs.

Ivy's alternate character designs in the games are a contrast to her primary designs, with the secondary from Soulcalibur to Soulcalibur III consisting of countess attire of either blue or red pants, vest, and jacket, with white boots covering her feet and her hair combed back. In Soulcalibur II, a tertiary alternate design was added consisting of a red leotard and gloves with gold trimming, with red stockings on her legs; in addition, a fourth design resembling her appearance at the conclusion of Soulcalibur was considered, incorporating a cloak and the symbol of caduceus on the front of her leotard cupping her breasts, but was unused. In Soulcalibur III, a long, rose-themed dress with hat and veil was used as a tertiary alternate, one of several considered designs. For Soulcalibur IV, a similarly themed black dress was used as her sole alternate design for the game.

Some versions of the original Soulcalibur arcade game censored Ivy's default costume by covering her bare skin with a lavender catsuit. With Soulcalibur IV, Ivy's look on the promotional artwork was modified on the English website to hide her undercleavage, leading to suspicion of censorship in the American release of the game. When asked about the censoring, director Katsutoshi Sasaki stated he had heard of nothing of the sort having taken place. When released in North America it was shown that no actual censorship had occurred within the game.

Appearances

In video games
As introduced in Soulcalibur, Ivy was raised by the Valentines, a noble family in London, England. Ivy's father became obsessed with the cursed sword Soul Edge, and worked himself to death. Her mother died shortly afterward, and revealed to Ivy that she was not their biological daughter. Becoming an alchemist, Ivy learned of her father's obsession and decided to destroy Soul Edge. She created an animated, segmented sword, bringing it to life by unknowingly summoning Soul Edge's current host, Nightmare, and was convinced to become one of his allies without realizing he wielded the blade she sought. After learning the truth, and that her real father was the sword's previous host Cervantes and her to be its next, she departed. Continuing her quest to destroy the sword in later games, Ivy was attacked by Cervantes and her soul consumed in Soulcalibur IV. Using an artificial soul to keep herself alive, Ivy managed to defeat her father at Ostrheinsburg Castle at the end of the game. She also acts as a teacher to younger warriors when Soul Edge re-appears years later.

The new timeline of Soulcalibur VI retells Ivy's creation of her sword, her temporary alliance with Nightmare, and the revelation of her true father Cervantes. She also broke into the Money Pit guarded by Voldo to steal the notes of his master Vercci. Ivy later gave back the notes to the blind guardian after obtaining the information she needed.

Outside of the main series, Ivy appears in the prequel Soulcalibur Legends, allying herself with the protagonist Siegfried, and shares an understanding with another of his allies, Lloyd Irving. In Soulcalibur: Broken Destinys "Gauntlet" storyline, a side story set after the events of Soulcalibur IV, Ivy assists the character Hilde and her party develop a cure for her father's ailment. When told that Cervantes' soul would be required as payment, they attempt to renegotiate, only for Ivy to use the protagonist's back as a chair while repeating her terms. She was also featured in as a guest character in Queen's Gate: Spiral Chaos, utilizing her character design from Soulcalibur IV. Ivy appears in The King of Fighters All Star in both her Soulcalibur VI design, and her "Aristocrat Catsuit" costume from Soulcalibur V. In the story mode, Ivy is initially hostile to Cassandra, but later helps her to defeat Saiki from The King of Fighters XIII.

Designed as a weapon with the longest reach in Soulcalibur, Ivy's sword Valentine consists of several smaller blades linked together by a chain, able to take either broadsword or chain whip forms. These forms are represented by different stances Ivy can use in the series, altering many of her attacks for each and applying different uses to either form of the weapon, with some, such as Spiral Lust, a component of an existing attack. In addition to these, the sword can also have the segments be split apart, in which case they will attack the opponent in different ways before recombining on the sword's chain. Due to her variety, Ivy has been noted as being able to attack from any range, but also difficult to properly use unless utilizing a range the opponent is weakest at. Some of her attacks, such as Summoning Suffering and Calamity Symphony, involve grappling with the opponent to damage them, though these utilize complex controller inputs that require them to be utilized in tandem with other moves.

Promotion and merchandising

Ivy was featured amongst other characters for Soulcalibur II's arcade flyer, and has been featured in other printed advertisements for games in the series. She has appeared on the cover on every Sony-based console game in the series, as well as Soulcalibur Legends for the Nintendo Wii. She is visible on the white Xbox 360 Soulcalibur IV arcade joystick alongside Hilde and Siegfried, and the box art for Korean distributions of the lilac-colored PSP. In addition, the character has been used to demonstrate the graphical features of both Soulcalibur IV and its follow-up title, Broken Destiny in a tech demo and promotional flyer respectively. Ivy was also featured alongside Siegfried in a manga adaptation of Soulcalibur Legends printed in the Japanese shōnen Kerokero Ace; the manga, written in a humorous tone, used a running gag of Siegfried's annoyance that Ivy was significantly taller than him. In 2011, the Russian publisher of Soulcalibur V 1C Company hired model Arina Ryabinina to portray the character at that year's IgroMir convention to promote the game's release. A 1999 advertisement for the Dreamcast port of Soulcalibur mainly focused on her visual appeal, depicting a man at a drive-in theater kissing his girlfriend but stopping to focus on Ivy. Two print advertisements for Soulcalibur V prominently featured close-up images of Ivy's cleavage and buttocks, respectively, along with puns about them, and were featured in various mainstream Japanese newspapers including Nikkan Sports.

Several action figures and figurines have been made bearing Ivy's likeness. Following the release of Soulcalibur, a resin kit by Kurushima was released, alongside a figurine by Kyosho. Epoch C-Works released a 1/12 scale Ivy action figure of in a set of three for the title as well, featuring equipable weapons. In August 2003, Todd McFarlane Productions released an Ivy sculpture amongst a set of five based on Soulcalibur II. The immobile figure was modeled after her primary outfit and stood six inches tall with a base and retracted sword. Yujin released a four inch tall figurine based upon her Soulcalibur II artwork as part of their "Namco Girls Series #5" line of gashapon figurines. A twelve inch tall immobile PVC figurine modeled after her Soulcalibur III appearance was released by Enterbrain in September 2008, using a white version of her outfit and extended sword; a dark blue outfit for an "international color" version of the sculpture was also produced. Hobby Japan created a mail order exclusive 1/8 scale PVC figure of Ivy in 2011 in honor of her appearance in Queen's Gate: Spiral Chaos. In 2012, an Ivy bobblehead was created by toy company Bobble Budds depicting her in her standard outfit was given to those who pre-ordered both the regular and Collector's Edition versions of Soulcalibur V.

Reception
Although commonly cited as one of the most difficult characters to play as in the Soul series, Ivy has received a great deal of positive reception and has been described as one of the series' best characters, as well as one of the most important and memorable characters in fighting games overall. In 
a 2015 community poll on the official Soulcalibur Facebook page, Ivy was voted the fourth most popular character in the series among fans. Among the outlets that have ranked her among the top characters in the series are IGN, which ranked her second and stated "Few, if any, Soul fighters so aptly sum up what the series is about as Ivy Valentine,"; Complex, which ranked her seventh; Fanbyte, which ranked her ninth, saying she was the series' "poster girl" and called her a "squarely Machiavellian jerk"; and TheGamer, which ranked her sixth, praising her strength as a fighter.

In 2009, she was featured on the cover of French magazine Ig alongside other female video game characters as one of the top heroines of gaming. Ivy was cited in the book "Disconnected America" as an example of Soulcalibur II's contrast to titles including Mortal Kombat and Street Fighter in terms of a comparable real-world experience. Play magazine called her one of the "finest females in all of 3D fighting", adding of the characters in the series she was the one they enjoyed playing as the most. Tom's Games named her one of the fifty greatest female characters in video game history, stating that as "an anti-hero who frequently clashes with other Souls, Ivy is a fascinating character for a fighting game". UGO.com placed her sixteenth on their list of the "Top 50 Evil Women", noting her role as an antagonist in the first Soulcalibur while adding that it could be "difficult to truly appreciate [her] villainy" due to her attractiveness, and adding that her appearance and attitude made her "a feared competitor". IGN also included her in their list of guest characters they would have liked to have seen for Super Smash Bros. Brawl. GameSpy named her one of the "25 Extremely Rough Brawlers" in video gaming, praising the brutality of her fighting style and weapon.

GameDaily named her, among other female characters in the Soul series, as an example of a strong and iconic female character in video gaming. The New York Times felt her appearance came from the same "Goth cyberaesthetic [...] that gave us The Matrix", one they felt was already becoming outdated. UGO named her one of the top eleven girls of gaming at number ten and one of the top eleven video game heroines at number eight, stating "What can you say about a chick that carries a whip? If you're talking about Ivy from the Soul Calibur series, you could say she's pretty intimidating." GameCentral said that Ivy is such a favorite of the series that "it’s impossible to imagine the game without [her]".

Sex appeal
Ivy's appearance, body, outfit, and demeanor have all been at the center of discussions about the character, and have been attributed as reasons owing to her status as a fan favorite. She is commonly compared to or described as a dominatrix, and has been noted both as the series' sexiest female. She has been displayed in various third-party media, her likeness appearing in material including magazine swimsuit issue pin-ups and periodicals such as Play's annual "Girls of Gaming" series. Other media outlets have compared her and Lara Croft in terms of attractiveness and sexualization. Other sources have used her as a standard for a character archetype, comparing later created female characters to her design and appearance.

From her Soulcalibur II appearance, Ivy was nominated in G4's 2004 G-Phoria awards show under "Hottest Character", alongside Vanessa Z. Schneider and Rikku; she was further a character in their 2005 Video Game Vixens awards show, winning in the category of "Kinkiest Accessory". Several other "Top Ten" lists have also featured Ivy in similar context, including those by Team Xbox, Machinima.com, and Spike TV. Ivy appeared several times in GameDailys "Babe of the Week" series of articles, including as a stand-alone article and at eleventh place in their "Top 50 Hottest Game Babes" article.  UGO.com ranked her eighteenth in their "Top 50 Videogame Hotties" article, stating "However much she instills fear in our hearts, we revel in the opportunity to stare at her from the safety of our television sets."

Reception of the character's sex appeal has been varied, however, with many outlets describing her outfit and appearance as oversexualized and unrealistic. In a 2016 study done by researchers at Indiana University, Ivy was found to be the most sexualized character out of 571 playable female video game characters created between 1989 and 2014. The study used a character's "nudity, over-enlarged breasts or hips and unrealistically narrow waists" as "signs of hypersexualization". Giant Bomb lists her as the most famous example of a sexualized woman in gaming. Books and studies written about Ivy have cited her sexualized design as the result of cultural standards for female characters in video games, which some say stems from the male gaze.

Her bodily proportions, specifically her bust and buttock size, have been criticized as over-the-top, unrealistic, and unnecessary by publications such as Joystiq, GameSpot, VentureBeat, The Spinoff, Vice,  and Kotaku. Her outfits have also been a point of contention, with MSNBC calling them "the pinnacle of preposterous", while GameCentral referred to them as "problematic". Writers from Forbes and Bleeding Cool remarked upon the inverse relationship between her bust size, which increases, and the amount of clothing she wears, which decreases, with each new installment. Other criticisms have been leveled towards her relatively youthful appearance in later installments despite technically being middle-aged. At the 2011 PAX East convention, an all-female journal panel led by The Escapists Susan Arendt agreed that while the character was strong and difficult but rewarding to master in the original Soulcalibur, she was reduced to "a nice ass bouncing around the room" in later games.

In contrast, some publications, including CVG, IGN, and GameSetWatch have suggested that her sexualized appearance makes her experience as a playable character more enjoyable. Other discussions of the character have identified her sex appeal as having the potential to be empowering and relatable to women, while others have said it serves as an essential aspect of her character. Writers have also questioned the discrepancy between the apathy towards the sexualization of underage characters in the series, such as Talim and Seong Mi-Na, as well as that of male characters in the series, such as Mitsurugi, and the outrage towards Ivy's sexualization on the basis of her large breasts.

See also

 List of Soulcalibur characters

References

External links

Fantasy video game characters
Female characters in video games
Fictional alchemists
Fictional British people in video games
Fictional English people in video games
Fictional Spanish people in video games
Fictional people from London
Fictional flexible weapons practitioners
Fictional offspring of rape
Fictional swordfighters in video games
Soulcalibur series characters
Video game characters introduced in 1998
Video game mascots
Nobility characters in video games
Woman soldier and warrior characters in video games
Namco protagonists